Obvious may refer to:


Music

Albums
Obvious (4Him album), 1998
Obvious (Plus One album), 2002

Songs
"Obvious", a song by Christina Aguilera from the album Christina Aguilera, 1999
"Obvious", a song by Blink-182 from the album Blink-182, 2003
"The Obvious", a song by Orgy from Punk Statik Paranoia, 2003
"Obvious" (Westlife song), 2004
"Obvious" (LeToya song), 2006
"Obvious", a song by The Operation M.D. from the album We Have an Emergency, 2007
"Obvious" (Charlee song), 2011
"Obvious", a song by Ariana Grande from the album Positions, 2020

Other uses
Obvious, an art collective that created the 2018 painting Edmond de Belamy
Ron Obvious, Canadian record producer
Ron Obvious (Monty Python)

See also
 Obviously (disambiguation)